Eua National Park is a national park on the island of Eua in Tonga. The park is located on the east coast of the island and covers an  band of tropical rainforest and is bordered on the west by sheer cliffs to the ocean, which have numerous caves and chasms. It received National Park Status in 1992. The area is protected by IUCN.

Biodiversity

Endemic flora
 Aglaia heterotricha 
 Arytera bifoliata 
 Discocalyx listeri
 Dysoxylum tongense 
 Guioa lentiscifolia
 Phyllanthus amicorum
 Pittosporum yunckeri
 Podocarpus pallidus, a rare and endangered conifer (approximately 1,000 trees) found in this location.
 Polyalthia amicorum
 Robiquetia tongensis
 Syzygium crosbyi
 Xylosma smithiana

Endemic fauna
 Lepidodactylus euaensis (Eua forest gecko), a rare and endangered gecko.
 Prosopeia tabuensis (red shining-parrot or red-breasted Koki), a species of parrot.
 Aerodrarnus spodiopygius (White rumped swiftlet)
 Phaethon lepturus (White-tailed tropicbird)

Attractions

Lokupo observation deck, located above a cliff and provides a view of the Lokupo Beach.
Big Ovava Tree (minimum of 800 years old)
Hafu pool
Ana Ahu (Smoking Cave), a  vertical sinkhole with a waterfall cascading into it - the mist rising up from the sinkhole gives it its name.
Funga Teemoa - the island's highest peak at

Further reading

See also
National parks of Tonga
List of National Parks

References

National park
National parks of Tonga